Huntsville Municipal Airport may refer to:

 Huntsville Municipal Airport (Arkansas) in Huntsville, Arkansas, United States
 Huntsville Municipal Airport (Texas) in Huntsville, Texas, United States